The New Zealand national cricket team toured the West Indies from March to May 1985 and played a four-match Test series against the West Indies cricket team which the West Indies won 2–0. New Zealand were captained by Geoff Howarth; the West Indies by Viv Richards.

Test series summary

First Test

Second Test

Third Test

Fourth Test

One Day Internationals (ODIs)

The West Indies won the series 5-0.

1st ODI

2nd ODI

3rd ODI

4th ODI

5th ODI

References

External links

1985 in New Zealand cricket
1985 in West Indian cricket
1984-85
International cricket competitions from 1980–81 to 1985
West Indian cricket seasons from 1970–71 to 1999–2000